Phycodes celebica is a moth in the family Brachodidae. It was described by Kallies in 1998. It is found on Sulawesi.

References

Natural History Museum Lepidoptera generic names catalog

Brachodidae
Moths described in 1998